The California golden trout (Oncorhynchus aguabonita or Oncorhynchus mykiss aguabonita), is a species of trout native to California. The golden trout is normally found in the Golden Trout Creek (tributary to the Kern River), Volcano Creek (tributary to Golden Trout Creek), and the South Fork Kern River. The Golden trout is the official freshwater state fish of California since 1947.

The California golden trout is closely related to two rainbow trout subspecies. The Little Kern golden trout (O. m. whitei), found in the Little Kern River basin, and the Kern River rainbow trout (O. m. gilberti), found in the Kern River system. Together, these three trout form what is sometimes referred to as the "golden trout complex".

Taxonomy
Originally the golden trout was described as a subspecies of the salmon species, with a name Salmo mykiss agua-bonita, and it is still often considered a subspecies (now called Oncorhynchus mykiss aguabonita) along with several other rainbow trout subspecies commonly known as redband trout.

FishBase and the Catalog of Fishes however now (2014) list O. aguabonita as an independent species rather than as subspecies of O. mykiss. Likewise, while ITIS lists O. m. whitei  and O. m. gilberti as subspecies of O. mykiss, O. aguabonita instead is listed as a full species.

Description
The golden trout has golden flanks with red, horizontal bands along the lateral lines on each side and about 10 dark, vertical, oval marks (called "parr marks") on each side. Dorsal, lateral and anal fins have white leading edges.

The golden trout should be distinguished from the similarly named golden rainbow trout, also known as the palomino trout. The golden rainbow is a color variant of the rainbow trout.

Outside of its native range in California, Golden trout are more often found in cirques and creeks in wilderness areas around 10,500–12,000"+, often beyond 12,500"+ passes that are not passable without crampons, ice axes, and ropes until after the Fourth of July. Their preferred water temperature is  but they can tolerate temperatures in degraded streams on the Kern Plateau as high as  so long as those waters cool during the night. The only other species of fish indigenous to the native range of California golden trout is the Sacramento sucker (Catostomus occidentalis occidentalis).

Record catches 
The IGFA "All-Tackle Length Record" for O. m. aguabonita measured  caught in Golden Lake, Wyoming in 2012.

Distribution 
O. m. aguabonita is native to the southern Sierra Nevada, including the upper reach and tributaries of the South Fork of the Kern River, and Golden Trout Creek and its tributaries. It has been introduced in hundreds of lakes and streams outside the native range, though most of these populations did not last or hybridized with cutthroat trout and other subspecies of rainbow trout.

History
In 1892, the California golden trout was originally described by David Starr Jordan, the first President of Stanford University, as Salmo mykiss agua-bonita. The fish was named after the Agua Bonita Waterfall where the first specimens were collected, at the mouth of Volcano Creek, at the creek's confluence with the Kern River. A century later they were listed as Oncorhynchus mykiss aguabonita in Behnke's Native trout of western North America.

In 1904, Stewart Edward White communicated to his friend President Theodore Roosevelt, that overfishing could lead to extinction of the golden trout. In White's novel The Mountains, he wrote about the threatened golden trout on California's Kern Plateau. Roosevelt shared White's concern and, through U.S. Fish Commissioner George M. Bowers, dispatched biologist Barton Warren Evermann of the U.S. Bureau of Fisheries to study the situation. In 1906 Evermann published The Golden Trout of the Southern High Sierras. Based on morphology, Evermann accurately described four forms of this native fish: Salmo roosevelti from Golden Trout (Volcano) Creek, Salmo aguabonita from nearby South Fork of the Kern River, Salmo whitei (named in recognition of Stewart Edward White) from the Little Kern River, and Salmo gilberti, the Kern River rainbow.

Genetic studies have since clarified three groups of trout native to the Kern River: California golden trout (O. m. aguabonita) native to the South Fork Kern River and Golden Trout Creek (tributary to the Kern River mainstem but the historic course of the South Fork Kern River and now only separated from it by a lava flow and ridge of sediment), Little Kern River golden trout (O. m. whitei), and Kern River rainbow trout (O. m. gilberti).

Conservation
Years of overexploitation, mismanagement and competition with exotic species have brought golden trout to the brink of being designated as "threatened". Introduced brook trout (Salvelinus fontinalis) outcompete them for food, introduced brown trout (Salmo trutta) prey on them and introduced rainbow trout (O. mykiss) hybridize with them, damaging the native gene pool through introgression. Populations have been in steady decline for decades.

In 1978, the Golden Trout Wilderness was established within Inyo National Forest and Sequoia National Forest, protecting the upper watersheds of the Kern River and South Fork Kern River.

In September 2004, the California Department of Fish and Game signed an agreement with federal agencies to work on restoring back-country habitat, heavily damaged by overgrazing from cattle and sheep, as part of a comprehensive conservation strategy.

The US Endangered Species Act (USESA) designated the subspecies O. m. whitei as LT, or Listed Threatened, since 1978, under the name Oncorhynchus aguabonita whitei.

Subspecies designations
NatureServe has designated the following NatureServe Conservation Status for the three subspecies:

 Oncorhynchus mykiss aguabonita—Golden trout (G5T1): Critically Imperiled, last reviewed in 2013. The primary threat is hybridization and introgression with stocked rainbow trout. Other threats include competition with non-native brown trout and rainbow trout, predation by brown trout, habitat degradation from cattle grazing, and possibly expanding beaver populations in the native range. Genetic studies showed hybridization with stocked rainbow trout in almost all known wild populations analyzed to as of 2003. Non-hybridized populations are restricted to less than 1% of their native range, and confinement to these areas for long periods create a significant risk of inbreeding depression, and loss of heterozygosity and genetic variance.
 Oncorhynchus mykiss gilberti—Kern River rainbow trout (G5T1Q): Critically Imperiled, with questionable taxonomy that may reduce conservation priority, last reviewed in 2005. Few if any genetically pure populations still exist. Primary threats include continued introgression with introduced rainbow trout, habitat loss from grazing, logging and road building, unpredictable events such as floods, drought, and fire (and subsequent landslides), and reduced habitat availability due to introduced beaver.
 Oncorhynchus mykiss whitei—Little Kern golden trout (G5T2Q): Imperiled, with questionable taxonomy that may reduce conservation priority, last reviewed in 2005. Hybridization with introduced rainbow trout is considered a threat, and "there is a constant threat from introductions of other salmonids by disgruntled anglers." The subspecies still occurs in the Little Kern River, above the falls on the lower river, though some populations show signs of introgression with coastal rainbow trout.

The American Fisheries Society has designated all three subspecies as Threatened since August 2008.

Translocations outside of endemic range
For sportfishing, the golden trout underwent many twentieth century translocations into multiple Western states and established populations survive in California, Idaho, Montana, Utah, Washington, Colorado, and Wyoming. Populations in the high-elevation lakes in the Ruby Mountains, Nevada, have died out.  The current status in other states where the California golden trout were planted (Arizona, New Mexico and Oregon) lacks documentation.

A self-sustaining introduced population also exists in the Rocky Mountains of Alberta, Canada; the province's golden trout population is managed by translocating fish between lakes to balance populations, but no new fish from other populations are introduced.

Chuck Yeager and the New Mexico population
When Colonel Chuck Yeager introduced one of his commanding officers, General Irving "Twig" Branch, to the Sierra Nevada populations of golden trout, Branch ordered Yeager and Bud Anderson to introduce the species to the mountain streams of New Mexico. However, the New Mexico populations have also died out.

In his second autobiography, Press On, Yeager details his annual fishing trips to catch golden trout which he extols as one of the best game fish and best eating fish to be found.

See also
Garibaldi California state saltwater fish.

References

Other sources
 

Oncorhynchus
Trout, Golden
Trout, Golden
Trout, Golden
Trout, Golden
Fish described in 1892
Critically endangered fish
Critically endangered fauna of California
Symbols of California
Subspecies
Freshwater fish of North America
Taxa named by David Starr Jordan